Mamoun Sakkal is a Syrian type designer, artist and calligrapher.

Awards
ADC Typography Bronze Cube 2018 for Sakkal Kitab Font.
Third International Calligraphy Competition: First Award in Kufi style, [Research Centre for Islamic History, Art and Culture, Istanbul, Turkey - 1993.
First place award in the Arab Human Development Report cover design competition, United Nations Development Programme, New York City - 2003.
Two Awards of Excellence for Sakkal Seta and Arabic Typesetting typefaces, Type Directors Club of New York International typeface design competition, 2003, and for Microsoft Uighur typeface in 2004.
First Prize in Letter Arts Review Magazine International Competition in 2005.

References

External links

Syrian calligraphers
People from Aleppo
Living people
Syrian artists
20th-century calligraphers
21st-century calligraphers
Year of birth missing (living people)
Typographers and type designers
Typographers of Arabic script